The generalized-strain mesh-free (GSMF) formulation is a local meshfree method in the field of numerical analysis, completely integration free, working as a weighted-residual weak-form collocation. This method was first presented by Oliveira and Portela (2016), in order to further improve the computational efficiency of meshfree methods in numerical analysis. Local meshfree methods are derived through a weighted-residual formulation which leads to a local weak form that is the well known work theorem of the theory of structures. In an arbitrary local region, the work theorem establishes an energy relationship between a statically-admissible stress field and an independent kinematically-admissible strain field. Based on the independence of these two fields, this formulation results in a local form of the work theorem that is reduced to regular boundary terms only, integration-free and free of volumetric locking.

Advantages over finite element methods are that GSMF doesn't rely on a grid, and is more precise and faster when solving bi-dimensional problems. When compared to other meshless methods, such as rigid-body displacement mesh-free (RBDMF) formulation, the element-free Galerkin (EFG) and the meshless local Petrov-Galerkin finite volume method (MLPG FVM); GSMF proved to be superior not only regarding the computational efficiency, but also regarding the accuracy.

The moving least squares (MLS) approximation of the elastic field is used on this local meshless formulation.

Formulation
In the local form of the work theorem, equation:

 

The displacement field , was assumed as a continuous function leading to a regular integrable function that is the kinematically-admissible strain field . Hence, this formulation considers that the displacement field , is a piecewise continuous function, defined in terms of the Heaviside step function and therefore the corresponding strain field , is a generalized function defined in terms of the Dirac delta function.

For the sake of the simplicity, in dealing with Heaviside and Dirac delta functions in a two-dimensional coordinate space, consider a scalar function , defined as:

 

which represents the absolute-value function of the distance between a field point  and a particular reference point , in the local domain  assigned to the field node .

For a scalar coordinate , the Heaviside step function can be defined as
 
 
 

 
 

and

 

 

Since the result of this equation is not affected by any particular value of the constant , this constant will be conveniently redefined later on.

The displacement field , can be conveniently defined as

 

This assumed displacement field , a discrete rigid-body unit displacement defined at collocation points. The strain field , is given by

 

Having defined the displacement and the strain components of the kinematically-admissible field, the local work theorem can be written as

 

Taking into account the properties of the Heaviside step function and Dirac delta function, this equation simply leads to

 

Discretization of this equations  can be carried out with the MLS approximation, for the local domain , in terms of the nodal unknowns , thus leading to the system of linear algebraic equations that can be written as

 

or simply

 

This formulation states the equilibrium of tractions and body forces, pointwisely defined at collocation points, obviously, it is the pointwise version of the Euler-Cauchy stress principle. This is the equation used in the Generalized-Strain Mesh-Free (GSMF) formulation which, therefore, is free of integration. Since the work theorem is a weighted-residual weak form, it can be easily seen that this integration-free formulation is nothing else other than a weighted-residual weak-form collocation. The weighted-residual weak-form collocation readily overcomes the well-known difficulties posed by the weighted-residual strong-form collocation, regarding accuracy and stability of the solution.

See also 
 Moving least squares
 Finite element method
 Boundary element method
 Meshfree methods
 Numerical analysis
 Computational Solid Mechanics

References

Numerical analysis